A Sinless Season is a novel by South African author Damon Galgut.  It was published in 1982  when the author was only seventeen.  It details the interactions between Scott, Raoul, and Joseph, three young inmates at the Bleda reformatory.

References

1982 novels
1982 debut novels
20th-century South African novels
Novels by Damon Galgut
Jonathan Ball Publishers books